Asikainen is a Finnish surname. Notable people with the surname include:

Alfred Asikainen (1888–1942), Finnish wrestler
Amin Asikainen, Finnish boxer
Veikko Asikainen (1918–2002), Finnish boxer
Kari Asikainen, Finnish interior designer
Lauri Asikainen, Finnish athlete

Finnish-language surnames